Madison County is a county located in the northeastern part of the U.S. state of Georgia. As of the 2020 census, the population was 30,120. The county seat is Danielsville. The county was created on December 5, 1811. The county's largest city is Comer with a population of 1,200.

Madison County was included in the Athens-Clarke County, GA Metropolitan Statistical Area, which is included in the Atlanta-Athens-Clarke County-Sandy Springs, GA Combined Statistical Area.

History
Madison County was organized by an act of the General Assembly of Georgia on December 11, 1811. It was named for James Madison, who served as the fourth president of the  United States from 1809 to 1817. It was the 38th county formed in Georgia, and began to function as a county in 1812. Madison County was formed from the counties of Clarke, Elbert, Franklin, Jackson, Oglethorpe.

Early agriculture in Madison County was devoted to food crops and livestock (cattle, hogs, and sheep), which were sufficient to feed the population. Just after the Civil War ended, the demand for a cash crop led to major reliance on cotton. The soils of Madison County were heavily damaged by this cotton monoculture. From the 1930s on, agriculture became more diverse. Today, agribusiness dominates the local economy, with poultry production particularly important.

Madison and Oglethorpe counties share Watson Mill Bridge State Park, the site of the longest covered bridge in Georgia. The bridge, which is over 100 years old, spans 229 feet of the South Fork of the Broad River. There are also facilities for camping, hiking trails, picnicking, and fishing in the park.

The Madison County Courthouse, one of the most ornate in Georgia, was built in 1901 for the sum of $18,314. It is listed on the National Register of Historic Places. New Hope Presbyterian Church, established in 1788, is the third oldest church in Georgia.

Lt. Col. Lemuel Penn, a decorated veteran of World War II and a United States Army Reserve officer, was murdered by members of the Ku Klux Klan on July 11, 1964, nine days after passage of the Civil Rights Act, on a Broad River bridge on the Georgia State Route 172 in Madison County.

Geography

The vast majority of Madison County is located in the Broad River sub-basin of the Savannah River basin, with just a very small portion of the county's western edge located in the Upper Oconee River sub-basin of the Altamaha River basin.

Adjacent counties
 Franklin County, Georgia - north
 Hart County, Georgia - northeast
 Elbert County, Georgia - east
 Oglethorpe County, Georgia - south
 Clarke County, Georgia - southwest
 Jackson County, Georgia - west
 Banks County, Georgia - northwest

Major highways

  U.S. Route 29
  State Route 8
  State Route 22
  State
Route 72 Business
  State
Route 72 Bypass
  State
Route 72 Spur
  State Route 98
  State Route 106
  State Route 172
  State Route 174
  State Route 191
  State Route 281

Demographics

2000 census
As of the census of 2000, there were 25,730 people, 9,800 households, and 7,330 families living in the county. There were 10,520 housing units at an average density of 37 per square mile (14/km2). The racial makeup of the county was 89.01% White, 8.46% Black or African American, 0.19% Native American, 0.28% Asian, 0.03% Pacific Islander, 1.03% from other races, and 0.99% from two or more races.  1.97% of the population were Hispanic or Latino of any race.

There were 9,800 households, out of which 34.60% had children under the age of 18 living with them, 60.60% were married couples living together 10.60% had a female householder with no husband present, and 25.20% were non-families. 21.50% of all households were made up of individuals, and 8.00% had someone living alone who was 65 years of age or older.  The average household size was 2.61 and the average family size was 3.04.

In the county, the population was spread out, with 26.30% under the age of 18, 8.20% from 18 to 24, 30.60% from 25 to 44, 23.90% from 45 to 64, and 11.00% who were 65 years of age or older.  The median age was 36 years. For every 100 females, there were 96.60 males.  For every 100 females age 18 and over, there were 93.70 males.

The median income for a household in the county was $36,347, and the median income for a family was $42,189. Males had a median income of $31,324 versus $22,426 for females. The per capita income for the county was $16,998.  About 9.20% of families and 11.60% of the population were below the poverty line, including 14.00% of those under age 18 and 16.50% of those age 65 or over.

2010 census
As of the 2010 United States Census, there were 28,120 people, 10,508 households, and 7,804 families living in the county. The racial makeup of the county was 87.6% white, 8.4% black or African American, 0.6% Asian, 0.3% American Indian, 1.9% from other races, and 1.2% from two or more races. Those of Hispanic or Latino origin made up 4.1% of the population. In terms of ancestry, 20.7% were American, 9.1% were Irish, 9.1% were English, and 7.2% were German.

Of the 10,508 households, 35.4% had children under the age of 18 living with them, 56.9% were married couples living together, 12.1% had a female householder with no husband present, 25.7% were non-families, and 21.5% of all households were made up of individuals. The average household size was 2.66 and the average family size was 3.07. The median age was 39.4 years.

The median income for a household in the county was $41,343 and the median income for a family was $49,713. Males had a median income of $37,963 versus $28,732 for females. The per capita income for the county was $18,975. About 14.7% of families and 17.8% of the population were below the poverty line, including 22.7% of those under age 18 and 18.4% of those age 65 or over.

2020 census

As of the 2020 United States Census, there were 30,120 people, 10,744 households, and 8,153 families residing in the county.

Government
The citizens of Madison County are represented by an elected six member board of commissioners.  Each commissioner represents one of five districts plus a chairman of the board elected at large for the whole county.

Board of Commissioners
 Chairman – 
 District 1 – 
 District 2 – 
 District 3 – 
 District 4 – 
 District 5 –

Education
Madison County public education is served by the Madison County School District. The Madison County Board of Education oversees and operates the public charter school system in the School District. Madison County Board of Education operates 5 elementary schools, 1 middle school, 1 high school and 1 career academy.

The Madison County Board of Education is overseen by 5 elected board members, from 5 districts in the county. The Board appoints a School Superintendent who works at the pleasure of the Board as a whole.

The district has 290 full-time teachers and over 4,621 students
 District 1 - Robert Hooper (Nov 2007 - Dec 2018)
 District 2 - Angie McGinnis (Jan 2015 - Dec 2018)
 District 3 - Cindy Nash (Jan 2013 - Dec 2020)
 District 4 - Byron Lee (Jan 2017 - Dec 2020)
 District 5 - Brenda Moon (Jan 2017 - Dec 2020)
School Superintendent - Dr. Allen McCannon (since May 2011)

Public Schools
 Colbert Elementary School
 Comer Elementary School
 Danielsville Elementary School
 Hull-Sanford Elementary School
 Ila Elementary School
 Madison County Middle School (MCMS), Home of the Mustangs
 Madison County High School (MCHS), Home of the Red Raiders
 Broad River College and Career Academy 

Private schools
 Union Christian Academy (private), Hull
 The Busy Box Pre-School (private), Hull
 The Learning Train Pre-School (private), Colbert
 Building Blocks Pre-School (private), Hull

Communities

Cities
 Carlton
 Colbert
 Comer
 Danielsville
 Hull
 Ila

Unincorporated communities
 Paoli
 Pocataligo

Notable people
 Allen Daniel Jr. - Major General, Speaker of the Georgia House of Representatives, State Senator, namesake of Danielsville
 Josh Fields - Major League baseball player
 Crawford W. Long - the man who first used ether in surgery was born in Danielsville
 Ralph Hudgens - Georgia Insurance and Safety Fire Commissioner
 Jake Westbrook - former Major League baseball player

Historic sites
 Watson Mill Bridge - the longest original-site covered bridge in Georgia
 Birthplace of Crawford W. Long
 Murder site of Lt. Col. Lemuel Penn
 William Bartram Trail

See also

 National Register of Historic Places listings in Madison County, Georgia
List of counties in Georgia

References

External links
 Madison County Official Website
 Madison County Chamber of Commerce

 
Georgia (U.S. state) counties
1811 establishments in Georgia (U.S. state)
Populated places established in 1811
Athens – Clarke County metropolitan area
Counties of Appalachia